In human rights, an interstate case occurs when another state party to a human rights treaty brings suit against another state for alleged violations of human rights.

Sources

International relations
Human rights